Aspidosperma subincanum is a timber tree native to Brazil and Bolivia. It is common in Cerrado vegetation in Brazil. It was first described by Carl Friedrich Philipp von Martius in 1838.

References

subincanum
Trees of South America
Plants described in 1838